Christopher Everett Crowe (born c. 1954 in Danville, Illinois) is an American professor of English and English education at Brigham Young University (BYU) specializing in young adult literature. In addition to his academic work, Crowe also writes books for the young-adult market, including Mississippi Trial, 1955.

Crowe was largely raised in Tempe, Arizona. He was a Catholic while growing up. Shortly before going to BYU he was given a copy of the Book of Mormon by a friend that also included an account of Joseph Smith's first vision in the front pages. Reading this account and identifying with it was a key catalyst to Crowe joining the Church of Jesus Christ of Latter-day Saints. He attended Brigham Young University on a football scholarship from 1972 to 1976 and graduated with a BA in English.  He earned an M.Ed. and an Ed.D. in English education from Arizona State University in 1986.

Crowe taught English and coached football and track at McClintock High School in Tempe, Arizona, for ten years.

Prior to joining the BYU faculty in 1993 Crowe had been a professor at Himeji Dokkyo University and Brigham Young University Hawaii.  In 2007, Crowe was awarded the Karl G. Maeser Excellence in Research and Creative Arts Award from BYU and in 2008 was awarded the Nan Osmond Grass Professorship in English.  In November 2010, he received the Ted Hipple Service Award from the Assembly on Literature for Adolescents of the NCTE (ALAN). For the 2016–2017 school year Crowe received BYU's Karl G. Maeser excellence in teaching award. He received BYU's highest faculty honor, the Karl G. Maeser Distinguished Lecturer Award in August 2020 and delivered the annual Karl G. Maeser Lecture in May 2021.

Crowe is a Latter-day Saint and recently served as a counselor in the Provo Utah Edgemont South Stake presidency.

Writings
Crowe has written many reviews of young adult literature.  He has been a contributor or editor of a wide variety of journals including Medical English and English Journal. He has also written articles on general trends in young adult literature including the chapter “Mormon Values in Young Adult Literature,” in The Last Taboo: Spirituality in Young Adult Literature (Lanham, MD: Scarecrow Press, 2015).

Books he has written include From the Outside Looking In: Short Stories for LDS Teenagers and Fatherhood, Football and Turning Forty: Confessions of a Middle-Aged Mormon Male, Presenting Mildred D. Taylor, Teaching the Selected Works of Mildred D. Taylor, Getting Away with Murder: The True Story of the Emmett Till Case, and Up Close: Thurgood Marshall. Crowe edited with Jesse S. Crisler the 2007 BYU Press publication How I Came to Write: LDS Authors for Young Adults. He is currently working on a book tentatively titled Teaching for Social Justice Using Young Adult Literature: Sports and the Quest for Civil Rights for the Rowman and Littlefield Series Teaching for Social Justice Using Young Adult Literature.

His debut novel, Mississippi Trial, 1955 (2002) on the Emmett Till case received mixed reviews. It also won several awards including the International Reading Association's Young Adult Novel Award. In 2012 he had his first children's book published Just As Good: How Larry Doby Changed America's Game. In 2014 his novel Death Coming Up the Hill was published by Houghton Mifflin Harcourt. This book deals with racism and the Vietnam War, and although its form of a Haiku with a syllable for every American soldier killed in Vietnam in 1968 seems a bit forced, at least some reviewers liked it. It won the 2014 Whitney Award for Young Adult fiction.

Notes

References
BYU faculty bio
Crowe's vita
BYU Magazine article on Crowe
teenreads entry on Crowe

External links
Personal website
Karl G. Maeser Distinguished Lecturer

Interview with Crowe by Utah Children's Writers and Illustrators
Google Scholar listing for Crowe

1950s births
American Latter Day Saint writers
American academics of English literature
Arizona State University alumni
Brigham Young University alumni
Brigham Young University faculty
Brigham Young University–Hawaii faculty
Living people
American writers of young adult literature
Latter Day Saints from Arizona
Latter Day Saints from Utah
Year of birth missing (living people)
Converts to Mormonism from Roman Catholicism